Big Japan is a four-piece indie rock band from Los Angeles, featuring Nathanial Castro on vocals and guitar, Brad Babinski on bass, guitarist Bret Harrison and Adam Brody on drums. The band only perform and record sporadically given Brody and Harrison's unpredictable schedules.

The band's name was originally Steven's Team, named after the movie The Cable Guy.

Big Japan's first release, Music for Dummies, was digitally released through Nightshift Records on August 23, 2005. The album's title was changed from "Music for Dummies" to "Untitled" and the limited number of CDs printed have become collectors items.

Discography
 Music for Dummies, later renamed Untitled (2005, Nightshift Records)

The OC
The OC, a successful television series in which Brody starred, featured a fictional band named Big Korea.
In the third season episode of The OC "The Perfect Storm", the character Chilli is seen wearing a Big Japan shirt.

External links
Big Japan on MySpace
Big Japan on Purevolume

Indie rock musical groups from California
Musical groups from Los Angeles
Musical groups established in 2005